Robert Michael Howfield (born 3 December 1936) is an English former professional sportsman who played both association football and American football.

Early and personal life
Howfield was born in Watford, and his son Ian Howfield kicked for the Houston Oilers in 1991.

Career

Association football
Howfield played as a forward, known for his volatility. Howfield began his association football career with local side Bushey F.C., before signing amateur terms with Millwall in May 1957. He became a professional with Watford in September 1957, playing for the club until July 1959, when he moved to Crewe Alexandra. In October 1959, however, he moved to Aldershot, where his 23 league goals in the 1961–62 season were a club record for a number of years. He played for the club until July 1962 when he returned to Watford for a "substantial fee".

Howfield moved to Fulham in November 1965 for £6000, having made 101 appearances and scored 25 goals in his two spells with the club. He scored three goals for Fulham in the last ten goal performance by a top-flight club.

During 1965 Howfield went to play with the New York Americans of the International Soccer League. He returned to Aldershot in August 1965, playing for the Hampshire club until 1967, before playing non-League football with Chelmsford City.

American football

Known for his powerful shooting, Howfield returned to America to take up American football as a place kicker. Between 1968 and 1970 he played for the Denver Broncos, before moving to the New York Jets in 1971, playing for them until 1974.

Later life
After his retirement from sport he worked in the insurance department of a Denver bank, and he still lives close to the city.

References

1936 births
Living people
Sportspeople from Watford
Association football forwards
English footballers
Millwall F.C. players
Watford F.C. players
Crewe Alexandra F.C. players
Aldershot F.C. players
Fulham F.C. players
Chelmsford City F.C. players
English Football League players
American football placekickers
Denver Broncos (AFL) players
New York Jets players
Denver Broncos players
English players of American football
Association football players that played in the NFL
New York Americans (soccer) players